Doreen Chesang (born 16 October 1990) is a Ugandan long-distance runner. In 2018, she competed in the women's half marathon at the 2018 IAAF World Half Marathon Championships held in Valencia, Spain. She finished in 49th place.

Career 

In 2017, she competed in the senior women's race at the 2017 IAAF World Cross Country Championships held in Kampala, Uganda. She finished in 25th place.

In 2018, she won the bronze medal at the Commonwealth Half Marathon Championships held in Cardiff, Wales.

In 2019, she competed in the senior women's race at the 2019 IAAF World Cross Country Championships held in Aarhus, Denmark. She finished in 63rd place.

In 2020, she competed in the women's half marathon at the 2020 World Athletics Half Marathon Championships held in Gdynia, Poland.

References

External links 
 

Living people
1990 births
Place of birth missing (living people)
Ugandan female long-distance runners
Ugandan female cross country runners
21st-century Ugandan women